is a Japanese freelance photographer known for his small photographs, which seek to individualize the photographic prints as objects.

Biography
Yamamoto was born in 1957 in Gamagori City in Aichi Prefecture, Japan. He began his art studies as a painter, studying oil painting under Goro Saito in his native city. He presently uses photography to capture images evoking memories. He blurs the border between painting and photography, by experimenting with printing surfaces. He dyes, tones (with tea), paints on, and tears his photographs. His subjects include still-lives, nudes, and landscapes. He also makes installation art with his small photographs to show how each print is part of a larger reality.

Exhibitions
é, PDX Contemporary Art, Portland, OR, 2005, Gallery Sincerite, Tyohashi, 2006; Mizuma Art Gallery, Tokyo, 2006.
Installations, HackelBury Fine Art, London; 2006
Nakazora, Galerie Camera Obscura, Paris, 2006; Nakazora Galerie Gabriel Rolt, Amsterdam, 2007; Quinzaine photographique Nantes, France, 2007.
Yamamoto Masao, Galleria Carla Sozzani, Milano, 2007; PDX Contemporary Art, Portland, OR, 2007; Craig Krull Gallery, Santa Monica, January 2008.
Kawa=Flow. Yancey Richardson Gallery, New York. September–October 2008; PDX Contemporary Art, Portland, OR, 2009; Fifty One Fine art photography, Antwerp, Belgium, 2009; Craig Krull Gallery, Santa Monica, January 2011.

Publications
A box of Ku, USA: Nazraeli Press, 1998.Nakazora. USA: Nazraeli Press, 2001.The Path of Green Leaves. One Picture Book 16. Tucson, AZ: Nazraeli Press, 2002. . English and Japanese.Santoka. Japan: Harunatsuakifuyu sousho, 2003.Omizuao. USA: Nazraeli Press, 2003.Small Things in Silence. Barcelona: RM, 2014. . With a text by Jacobo Siruela, "Nature's messenger = El mensajero de la naturaleza". Text in English and Spanish.é. USA: Nazraeli Press, 2005.Fujisan. One Picture Book 48. Portland, OR: Nazraeli Press, 2008. . Edition of 500 copies.Yamamoto Masao. Prism Series Book 1. Cape Cod, MA:: 21st Editions, 2011. With a Text and a poem by John Wood.川KAWA=Flow. Japan: Kochuten Books, 2011.Where we met.'' Belgium: Lannoo Publishers, 2011. A collaboration with Belgian drawer and painter Arpaïs Du Bois.

References

External links

Masao Yamamoto at Craig Krull Gallery
Yamamoto Masao published by 21st Editions

1957 births
Japanese photographers
Living people